John Struble may refer to:
 John T. Struble, builder, farmer and judge in the state of Iowa